This is a list of Romanian film and theatre directors. It includes some foreign-born film and theatre directors who have worked or lived in Romania.

A
 Haig Acterian
 Dan Alexe
 Mitch Anderson
 Victor Antonescu

B
 Paul Barbăneagră
 Andrei Blaier
 Elisabeta Bostan
 Ion Bostan
 Lucian Bratu

C
 Paul Călinescu
 Virgil Calotescu
 Ion Filotti Cantacuzino
 Nae Caranfil
 Ion Caramitru
 Octav Chelaru
 Liviu Ciulei
 Dinu Cocea
 Ioan Mihai Cochinescu
 Mihai Constantinescu
 Stefan Constantinescu

D
 Mircea Daneliuc
 Iosif Demian
 George Dorobanțu
 Mircea Drăgan

F
 Vlad Feier

G
 Emil Gârleanu

M
 Manole Marcus
 Horaţiu Mălăele
 Iulian Mihu
 Cătălin Mitulescu
 Anghel Mora
 George Motoi
 Vlad Mugur
 Mihai Măniuțiu

N
 Gheorghe Naghi
 Doru Năstase
 Jean Negulesco
 Cristian Nemescu
 Sergiu Nicolaescu

P
 Lucian Pintilie
 Corneliu Porumboiu
 Dan Puric

S
 Andrei Șerban
 Florin Șerban

V
 Vasile Vasilache
 Mircea Veroiu
 Gheorghe Vitanidis

Z
 Florin Zamfirescu

See also
Cinema of Romania

Lists of film directors by nationality
Film directors
Performing arts in Romania
 
 
Theatre-related lists